Bernardo Hernández may refer to:

 Bernardo Hernández González (born 1970), Spanish technology entrepreneur and business angel
 Bernardo Hernández Blázquez, Spanish businessman, founder in the 1930s of the ham producer company BEHER
 Bernardo Hernández Villaseñor (born 1942), Mexican footballer
 Bernardo Hernández de León (born 1993), Mexican footballer